Martin Gilbert (born October 30, 1982) is a Canadian former professional racing cyclist and Olympian. He competed in the 2008 Beijing Summer Olympics in the Men's Madison event, placing 12th.

Major results
2000
 1st Prologue Tour de l'Abitibi
2003
 National Under-23 Road Championships
1st  Road race
3rd Time trial
2005
 1st Stage 1 Tour de Beauce
 8th Road race, Pan American Road Championships
2006
 9th Road race, Commonwealth Games
2007
 1st  Road race, Pan American Road Championships
2009
 1st Stage 7 Tour of Missouri
 1st Stage 4 Vuelta a Cuba
2010
 1st Stages 9 & 11 Vuelta Ciclista del Uruguay
 1st Stages 5 & 15 Vuelta a Cuba
 7th Philadelphia International Championship
2011
 4th Châteauroux Classic
 6th Univest Grand Prix

References

External links

Team Bio

1982 births
Living people
Canadian male cyclists
Canadian track cyclists
Cyclists from Quebec
Cyclists at the 2008 Summer Olympics
Olympic cyclists of Canada
Cyclists at the 2006 Commonwealth Games
People from Châteauguay